Institute of Petroleum Studies Kampala, IPSK, is a privately owned institution that offers training and instruction in the field of petroleum exploration, recovery, refinement and responsible utilization in Uganda.

Location
The campus of the institute is located at Plot 6207 Rose Lane Tank hill, in the Muyenga neighborhood, in the Makindye Division of Kampala, the capital and largest city in the country.

Overview
The institute was founded in 2013. The first principal of the institute was Brian Sallery. The institute offers courses that lead to the award of certificates, diplomas, degrees and master's degrees in oil and gas management.

Academics
The institute offers the following courses:

 Certificates courses
 Certificate in Oil & Gas

 Diploma courses
 Diploma Oil & Gas Management

 Undergraduate courses 
 Bachelor of Science in Oil & Gas Management
 Bachelor of Science in Environmental Health & Safety Management

 Postgraduate courses
 Master of Business Administration in Oil & Gas
 Master of Laws in Oil & Gas
 Master of Science in Environmental Health & Safety Management.

See also

 Ugandan university leaders
 List of universities in Uganda
 Education in Uganda

References

External links
 Website of Institute of Petroleum Studies Kampala
  Explosion of institutes a cause for worry

Universities and colleges in Uganda
Educational institutions established in 2013
Economy of Kampala
2013 establishments in Uganda
Petroleum infrastructure in Uganda
Petroleum engineering schools